St James’ Church, Shardlow is a Grade II listed parish church in the Church of England in Shardlow, Derbyshire.

History

The foundation stone was laid on 14 August 1837 by James Sutton Esq. The foundation stone was laid over a cavity containing several coins of the late reign, and covered with a brass plate on which was engraved the following inscription: The first Stone of this Church, erected by voluntary contribution, and Dedicated to Saint James, was laid on the Fourteenth day of August, Anno Domini MDCCCXXXVII, in the First year of the Reign of Her Majesty Queen Victoria by James Sutton, Esquire, to the Glory of Almighty God, and for the Salvation of the Souls of Men. The Reverend Nathaniel Palmer Johnson M.A., Rector of Aston. Henry Isaac Stevens, Architect.

The partly completed church was damaged in a storm on 1 July 1838 when it was struck by lightning.

It was consecrated by the Bishop of Ripon on 9 April 1839.

Parish status
The church is in a joint parish with 
All Saints’ Church, Aston-upon-Trent
St Wilfrid's Church, Barrow-upon-Trent
St Bartholomew’s Church, Elvaston
St James’ Church, Swarkestone
St Andrew’s Church, Twyford
St Mary the Virgin’s Church, Weston-on-Trent

Organ

The church contains an organ by J.W. Walker dating from 1868. A specification of the organ can be found on the National Pipe Organ Register.

See also
Listed buildings in Shardlow and Great Wilne

References

Church of England church buildings in Derbyshire
Grade II listed churches in Derbyshire
Churches completed in 1839